Out Alive is Primitive Radio Gods' fifth album, the third of such released independently and exclusively through their official website. Unlike their previous album, Sweet Venus, which was only available in MP3 format, Out Alive was released in a limited edition CD slipcase, but only 35 copies were available for purchase from their web site. A second run, in digipak format featuring new cover art by guitarist Luke McAuliffe, was released in August 2012.

Track listing

Notes
"To Catch the Light" and "Can I" were referred to as "Unkind Light" and "Into the Blue" respectively on the first edition sleeve and in social media before the album's release, but appear under the given title on the first edition disc and consistently throughout the second edition packaging.
"Hard Rain Soft Skin" contains a lyrical allusion to "Children of the Helmet Law" from Still Electric.
"Three Small Blue Lights" is an extension of a musical interlude in the track "Whatever Wakes McCool" from White Hot Peach.

References

Primitive Radio Gods albums
2010 albums